This is an incomplete list of shopping malls in Azerbaijan.

Baku
 Park Bulvar
 AF Com Center
 AF Mall
 AMAY Trade Center
 Aygun City
 Azure
 Bina Trade Center
 Caspian Shopping Center
 Central Shopping Mall
 City Mall
 Deniz Mall
 Diglas Trade Center
 Elite Trade and Entertainment Center
 Ganjlik Mall
 Khagani Trade Center
Mall 28
 Metropark
 Moscow Shopping Mall
 Nargiz Shopping Center
 Nasimi Bazaar
 Oriental Bazaar
Port Baku Mall
 Port Baku Towers
 Riyad Trade Center
 Sadarak Trade Center
 Sahil Trade Center
 Shuvalan Park

Ganja
Ganja Mall
 Aura Park
 Abad Trade Center
 Ganja Central Shopping Center
 Golden Palace Shopping Center

References

Azerbaijan
Shopping malls